Live in Europe is the first live album by American rock band Creedence Clearwater Revival. Although released in 1973, it was recorded in 1971 during the Pendulum tour.

Overview 
The album is notable because it documents the band performing as a trio, following Tom Fogerty's departure. It was released, despite John Fogerty's strong objections, after his final struggles with Fantasy Records over his songwriting. In 1973, Fogerty said he would never play a Creedence song again, as it would only benefit Fantasy Records—a promise he kept for some 20 years.

Track listing
All songs by John Fogerty, except where noted.
Side one
"Born on the Bayou" – 5:05
"Green River/Susie Q" (Fogerty/Dale Hawkins, Eleanor Broadwater, Stan Lewis) – 4:31
"It Came Out of the Sky" – 3:11
Side two
"Door to Door" (Stu Cook) – 2:00
"Travelin' Band" – 2:12
"Fortunate Son" – 2:25
"Commotion" – 2:34
"Lodi" – 3:15
Side three
"Bad Moon Rising" – 2:13
"Proud Mary" – 2:52
"Up Around the Bend" – 2:42
"Hey Tonight" – 2:30
"Sweet Hitch-Hiker" – 3:05
Side four
"Keep on Chooglin'" (with an interpolation of Pagan Baby from about 4:45-6:35) – 12:47

A budget-priced 1987 reissue of the album omitted "Door to Door" and "Sweet Hitch-Hiker" (the studio versions of which were both originally recorded by the band as a trio) to fit the album on a single LP. When the album was remastered and issued on CD by Fantasy Records in 1999, the two missing songs were restored.

Personnel
John Fogerty – guitars, harmonica, lead vocals
Stu Cook – bass guitar, vocals, lead vocals on "Door to Door"
Doug Clifford – drums

Charts

References

External links

Creedence Clearwater Revival live albums
1973 live albums
Fantasy Records live albums